Ispica is a city and comune in the south of Sicily, Italy. The first mention in a document of Ispica occurred in 1093, in a list of churches and ecclesiastic departments for administrative purposes, but the territory has been colonized since the Bronze Age.

The city is located on a hill. The main economical activity consists of farming and organic products, especially carrot, zucchini, tomatoes, olives, vineyards. Ispica is the largest producer of organic carrot of southern Italy with about 18,000 tons of annual production.

The town also hosts examples of Sicilian Baroque architecture such as the Vincenzo Sinatra's Basilica di Santa Maria Maggiore, the Annunziata Church, the Carmine monastery, and the St. Barthelemy cathedral.

Ispica was destroyed by the 1693 Sicily earthquake and rebuilt on its present site.

Tourist Information

The Pro Loco Spaccaforno manages a tourist information point in the city center. 
Tourist information, also in English, is available on the website Visit Ispica. There are a number of processions which take place on Holy Thursday. If traveling to Ispica, the bus station is in a much safer and more convenient location than the train station, which is located on the outskirts of town.

The Cava d'Ispica (Cave of Ispica) consists of a series of housing units.

Cava d'Ispica

The Cava d'Ispica (Cave of Ispica) consists of a series of housing units carved in rocky formations. Built prior to the Greek colonization, these houses were used until the end of the nineteenth century.

People 

 Corrado Lorefice, (1962) archbishop of Palermo

References

Sources
 Trigilia, Melchiorre (1989). Storia e guida di Ispica. So.Ge.Me Editore.
 Visitispica.com Visit Ispica - English Website Visit Ispica is a registered trade mark by Pro Loco Spaccaforno

Sicilian Baroque
Municipalities of the Province of Ragusa